"Leave Them Boys Alone" is a song recorded by American singer-songwriter and musician Hank Williams Jr. with Waylon Jennings and Ernest Tubb. It was released in May 1983 as the second single from Williams' album Strong Stuff. The song reached number 6 on the Billboard Hot Country Singles chart. It was written by Williams, Dean Dillon, Gary Stewart and Tanya Tucker.

Content
The lyrics of the song, much like Williams' Family Tradition echo the sentiment that the outlaw singers and their current escapades were predated by the hard living honky-tonkers of the 1950s such as Hank Williams, Sr. and Ernest Tubb, prior to the music being fairly taken over by the Nashville Sound in the 1960s.

Critical reception
Reviewing Strong Stuff for Record magazine, Lee Ballinger dismissed "Leave Them Boys Alone" as the album's "obligatory song about other Southern musicians".

Chart performance

References

1983 singles
1983 songs
Hank Williams Jr. songs
Waylon Jennings songs
Ernest Tubb songs
Elektra Records singles
Curb Records singles
Songs written by Dean Dillon
Songs written by Hank Williams Jr.
Song recordings produced by Jimmy Bowen
Vocal collaborations